Anolis opalinus, the Jamaican opal-bellied anole or Bluefields anole, is a species of lizard in the family Dactyloidae. The species is found in Jamaica.

References

Anoles
Reptiles described in 1850
Endemic fauna of Jamaica
Reptiles of Jamaica
Taxa named by Philip Henry Gosse